M31-RV is a possible red cataclysmic variable star located in the Andromeda Galaxy (M31) that experienced an outburst in 1988, which is similar to the outburst V838 Monocerotis experienced in 2002. Such objects have been called luminous red novae or intermediate-luminosity red transients. During the outburst, both V838 Mon and M31-RV reached a maximum absolute visual magnitude of -9.8.

In 2006, the area around M31-RV was observed using the Hubble Space Telescope, but only red giants were seen. It is thought that the star either became too dim for Hubble to see, or the star is a companion of one of the red giants, or the star is one of the red giants themselves.

M31-RV reached a peak visual magnitude of 17 before fading rapidly and showing dust formation. The most likely explanation states that these outbursts occur during stellar merger events.

See also

 AE Andromedae

References

Andromeda (constellation)
Andromeda Galaxy
M-type supergiants
Luminous red novae
Stars in the Andromeda Galaxy
Extragalactic stars